Firmino Bernardino (born 19 March 1950) is a Portuguese racing cyclist. He rode in the 1975 Tour de France.

References

1950 births
Living people
Portuguese male cyclists
Place of birth missing (living people)